Ernst Gottlieb von Steudel (30 May 1783 – 12 May 1856) was a German physician and an authority on grasses.

Biography
Ernst Gottlieb von Steudel was born at Esslingen am Neckar in Baden-Württemberg. 
He was educated at the University of Tübingen, earning his medical doctorate in 1805. Shortly afterwards he settled into a medical practice in his hometown of Esslingen  and in 1826  became the chief state physician in what had become the Kingdom of Württemberg.

In 1825, together with Christian Ferdinand Friedrich Hochstetter (1787-1860), he organized an organization in Esslingen known as Unio Itineraria (Württembergischer botanische severein). The purpose of this society was to send young botanists out into the world to discover and collect plants in all of their varieties thus promoting and expanding botanical studies and herbaria throughout the Kingdom and beyond. Hochstetter himself traveled to Portugal, Madeira, and the Azores, and Steudel was able to create a herbarium of over 20,000 species. Steudel and Hochstetter were the co-authors of Enumeratio plantarum Germaniae (1826).

The botanical genera Steudelago (Kuntze, 1891) and Steudelella (Honda, 1930) honor his name.

Publications 
 Nomenclator botanicus, 2 volumes (1821-1824), An alphabetical listing of more than 3300 genera and approximately 40,000 species.
 Enumeratio plantarum Germaniae, 1826 (with Christian Ferdinand Hochstetter).
 Synopsis planterum glumacearum, 2 volumes (1853-1855), Volume I is dedicated to the botanical family Poaceae, and Volume II involves Cyperaceae and affiliated families.

References 

19th-century German physicians
Agrostologists
1783 births
1856 deaths
People from Esslingen am Neckar
People from the Duchy of Württemberg
University of Tübingen alumni
19th-century German botanists